Adrian Voinea was the defending champion, but did not participate.

Tim Henman won the title, defeating Dominik Hrbatý 6–2, 6–2 in the final.

Goran Ivanišević retired in his second round match against Lee Hyung-taik, after he angrily smashed all of his rackets.

Seeds
A champion seed is indicated in bold text while text in italics indicates the round in which that seed was eliminated.

Draw

Finals

Top half

Bottom half

References

External links
Draw

Singles
2000 ATP Tour